Saptagiri Express is a 2016 Indian Telugu-language action comedy film directed by Arun Pawar and produced by Dr. K. Ravi Kirane under Sai Celluloid Cinematic Creations Banner with music composed by Bulganin. The film marks actor and comedian Saptagiri's first hero role. Sapthagiri also wrote the film, which is an adaptation of the Tamil film Thirudan Police, which will have him in the role of a constable.

The film was initially titled Katamarayudu, which was changed after Pawar and Sapthagiri learned that Pawan Kalyan was starring in a film by the same name. Filming for Saptagiri Express concluded around the beginning of October 2016 and there was a projected release date of November of the same year.

Cast
 Saptagiri as Saptagiri
 Roshni Prakash as Poornima
 Ali
 Shakalaka Shankar as Kaanipaakam
 Posani Krishna Murali
 Sayaji Shinde
 Ajay Ghosh

Soundtrack

References

External links

2016 films
2016 comedy films
2010s Telugu-language films
Indian comedy films
Telugu remakes of Tamil films